The fistball competition at the 2013 World Games were held from August 1 to August 4, at the Comfenalco Valle de Lili in Cali. Colombia.

Schedule

Medal table

Results

Preliminaries

Second phase

Rankings

References

2013 World Games
2013